The Sony Cyber-shot DSC-H400 is a DSLR-like ultrazoom bridge camera announced by Sony on February 13, 2014. At the time of its release, it was the compact camera with the longest reach, with a maximum equivalent focal length of 1550mm. In March 2015, the Nikon Coolpix P900 was released with 2000mm equivalent maximum focal length.

References

http://www.dpreview.com/products/sony/compacts/cybershot_dsch400/specifications

H400
Cameras introduced in 2014
Superzoom cameras
Digital cameras with CCD image sensor